Vorona is a commune in Botoșani County, Western Moldavia, Romania. It is composed of six villages: Icușeni, Joldești, Poiana, Vorona, Vorona Mare and Vorona-Teodoru.

Vorona is situated on the Suceava Plateau. It lies on the banks of the Siret River, and its left tributary, the river Vorona.

See also
Vorona Monastery

References

Communes in Botoșani County
Localities in Western Moldavia